Charles Vanderstappen (born 1882, date of death unknown) was a Belgian footballer. He played in five matches for the Belgium national football team from 1904 to 1907.

References

External links
 

1882 births
Year of death missing
Belgian footballers
Belgium international footballers
Place of birth missing
Association football forwards